The 2008 Three Days of De Panne was the 32nd edition of the Three Days of De Panne cycle race, held from 1–3 April 2008. It started in Middelkerke and finished in De Panne, and was won by Joost Posthuma.

General classification

References

Three Days of Bruges–De Panne
2008 in Belgian sport